David Wellington Mersereau (February 16, 1868 – December 13, 1958) was a Canadian politician. He served in the Legislative Assembly of New Brunswick from 1917 to 1925 as member of the Liberal party. He died in 1958, aged 90.

References 

1868 births
1958 deaths
New Brunswick Liberal Association MLAs